For the Lions is a cover album by American metalcore band Hatebreed. The album was released on May 5, 2009 through Koch Records. The album consists of 18 cover songs from bands that had an influence on Hatebreed's music. The album was originally set to be released in winter 2008, but the band wanted to record a few more tracks for the record, and so the release date was pushed back.

Singles
Starting on March 31, Hatebreed released a new single from For the Lions for purchase on iTunes every Tuesday until the album was released. The first single released was the cover of Black Flag's "Thirsty and Miserable". This single was followed by Suicidal Tendencies' "Suicidal Maniac", Sick of It All's "Shut Me Out", Slayer's "Ghosts of War", and finally Metallica's "Escape". Hatebreed also filmed a music video for their cover of "Ghosts of War". A video for "Thirsty and Miserable" was also filmed.

Reception

For the Lions received mixed to positive reviews from critics. On Metacritic, the album holds a score of 66/100 based on 4 reviews, indicating "generally favorable reviews."

Music review blog Gears of Rock said the band "diligently delivers all classic tracks with their signature blistering ferocity."

Track listing

Best Buy Exclusive Tracks

Charts

Personnel
 Jamey Jasta – vocals
 Frank Novinec – rhythm guitar
 Chris Beattie – bass guitar
 Wayne Lozinak – lead guitar
 Matt Byrne – drums
 Produced, engineered and mixed by Chris "Zeuss" Harris

References

2009 albums
Hatebreed albums
Covers albums
Albums produced by Chris "Zeuss" Harris